Alberto Gallego Laencuentra (born 16 March 1974) is a Spanish retired footballer who played as a midfielder, and a manager.

Gallego was also a singer, and played under the name of Lanco.

Career
Born in Lleida, Catalonia, Gallego represented CD Binéfar, Alcobendas CF and UD Benabarre as a player. After retiring with the latter in 2009, he was named manager, and helped the side to promote to the Regional Preferente in 2012.

In December 2012, Gallego resigned from his club to take over hometown side CE EFAC Almacelles, achieving promotion to Primera Catalana before leaving in 2014. In the 2015–16 season, he worked at Rayo Vallecano's staff while managing their Juvenil squad.

In 2016, Gallego moved abroad and joined Rayo OKC as their director of football. In February 2017, he moved to New York Cosmos and worked as an assistant manager before returning to Spain in June 2018, after being named in charge of Tercera División side CF Pobla de Mafumet.

On 5 January 2020, Gallego replaced compatriot Juan Ferrando at the helm of Super League Greece side Volos FC. He was sacked on 25 February, with the club seriously threatened with relegation, and was replaced by his assistant Stefanos Xirofotos.

On 24 July 2020, Gallego was appointed manager of CD Ibiza Islas Pitiusas in the fourth division. In June of the following year, after helping the side in their promotion to the new fourth tier, Segunda División RFEF, he left.

On 18 June 2021, Gallego was announced as manager of Recreativo de Huelva in Tercera División RFEF. He achieved promotion with the side after leading their group, but resigned on 13 April 2022, alleging "personal attacks".

On 22 June 2022, Gallego took over Elche CF's reserves also in the fifth division. On 5 October, he became the interim manager of the first team, after Francisco was sacked.

Gallego subsequently returned to his previous role after the appointment of Jorge Almirón, and left the reserves on a mutual agreement on 23 November 2022.

Musical career
While playing football at Lleida, Gallego also composed songs and had guitar lessons at his home. In 1994, he sang at the Benidorm International Song Festival under the name of Alberto 'Lanco', but later refused a musical career to pursue a football one. However, after fracturing his nose at Alcobendas, he would record two albums under the name of Lanco, until reaching the finals of the 2005 Eurovision Song Contest.

Discography

Albums
 Mi Mente (1999, Vamm Records)
 Amanece Pop (2004, O'Clock Music)

References

External links

1974 births
Living people
Sportspeople from Lleida
Spanish footballers
Footballers from Catalonia
Association football midfielders
CD Binéfar players
Spanish football managers
La Liga managers
Tercera División managers
Tercera Federación managers
CF Pobla de Mafumet managers
Super League Greece managers
Volos FC managers
Recreativo de Huelva managers
Elche CF Ilicitano managers
Elche CF managers
Spanish expatriate football managers
Spanish expatriate sportspeople in the United States
Spanish expatriate sportspeople in Greece
Expatriate football managers in Greece
Spanish musicians